Skylink is the brand name for bus services that serve East Midlands Airport in Leicestershire. Services are presently operated by Kinchbus and trentbarton, both a part of Derbyshire-based Wellglade Group.

History
Nottingham City Transport previously operated the Skylink Nottingham service until 2012 when the service was replaced by a new Skylink service operated by trentbarton via Long Eaton, which also replaced the indigo service between Long Eaton and Loughborough via East Midlands Airport and Sutton Bonington that ran between 2002 and 2012. 

Following a local petition, an hourly extension service to Coalville via Shepshed was introduced in September 2015.

Kinchbus have operated the Skylink service between Leicester and Derby since April 2009. The route was originally called AirLine Shuttle, and ran between Loughborough and Long Eaton then Derby via the airport. 

Arriva Midlands previously operated a limited-stop service (coloured light green) between Leicester and the airport via New Parks and the M1 between 2006 and 2009, this service was replaced by an extension of the now branded Skylink Derby service which runs down the A6 to Leicester via Birstall.

Services
Skylink buses operate 24 hours a day 7 days a week on the Leicester/Derby and Nottingham routes, the Skylink Express buses no longer operate overnight but do operate from 4am until midnight.

Although not a part of Skylink brand, trentbarton also operate hourly extensions to East Midlands Airport on their My15 route between Ilkeston and New Sawley, while Diamond East Midlands extended their service AirLine 9 to East Midlands Airport in 2019, connecting the airport with Ashby-de-la-Zouch, Swadlincote and Burton-upon-Trent..

Service Cutbacks
During August 2022, Trent Barton and Kinchbus announced from 2 October 2022 that Skylink routes would undergo an overhaul

The planned changes are:

• Skylink Derby buses will have all journeys serving East Midlands Gateway and Kegworth.

• Skylink Derby journeys via Long Whatton and Diseworth will be withdrawn and replaced by a re-routing of Skylink Nottingham journeys to/from Coalville will now serve Long Whatton and Diseworth but journeys between 8pm and 5am will be withdrawn.

•Skylink Nottingham journeys to/from Loughborough were planned to be withdrawn but funding has allowed these to be retained until at least April 2023.

• All Skylink Nottingham and Skylink Express journeys will now serve the new Broadmarsh Bus Station in Nottingham.

Fleet
Trent Barton operate 11 Enviro200 MMCs on their Skylink Nottingham route while the Skylink Express services are currently using Wright Solars which will be replaced by newer buses which are surplus from other trentbarton services.

Kinchbus upgraded the Leicester-Derby route with 12 ADL Enviro200 MMCs to help meet the Leicester clean air zone requirements which came into force during late 2020. These new buses replaced Mercedes-Benz Citaro's.

References 

Bus routes in England
East Midlands Airport
Airport bus services